For more information on main flags see article: Flag of Croatia
This is a list of flags which have been, or are still today, used in Croatia or by Croatians and Croats.

Modern Flag

Standard

Military

Army

Navy

Air Force

Coast Guard

Police

Security and Intelligence Agency

Subnational flags

Municipality flags

Political flags

Ethnic groups flags

Historical flags

Historical national flags

Royal Standards

Coronation Standards

Historical city flags

Historical regional flags

Historical flags (medieval)

Republic of Ragusa flags

Other

Flag proposals

Croatian people in other countries

Burgees of Croatia

Notes

References

External links

Croatia - Historical Flags (1848-1918)

 
Croatia
Flags